Fairchildren is Ott's fourth album. It was released on 11 August 2015 on his  Bandcamp.

Track listing 
"A Gentle Place By Birth Is You" - 2:41
"16mm Summer Day" - 7:16
"Coursing Batch" - 9:15
"Harwell Dekatron" - 6:53
"Unit Delta Plus" - 8:10
"Hello, My Name Is..." - 6:32
"The Bicycle Of The Sky" - 6:11
"Ship Is Not A Child" - 10:42

External links
 Fairchildren on Ott's Bandcamp

Ott (record producer) albums
2015 albums